Viktor Kopyl (10 July 1960 – 8 August 2014) was a Ukrainian footballer.  He most notably played for Karpaty Lviv and Volyn Lutsk.

References

1960 births
Ukrainian footballers
2014 deaths
FC Karpaty Lviv players
FC Volyn Lutsk players
FC Kryvbas Kryvyi Rih players
FC Bukovyna Chernivtsi players
FC Kremin Kremenchuk players
Association footballers not categorized by position